Cayetano Saporiti  (January 14, 1887 – 1954) was a Uruguayan football goalkeeper who played 56 games for the Uruguay national team between 1905 and 1919.

Biography
He made his debut for the national team at 18 years 179 days making him the third youngest international goalkeeper in history.

He was part of the Uruguay team that won the Copa América tournament in 1916 and 1917, he also participated in 1919.

His record of 51 caps in the goalkeeper position stood as a national record until it was surpassed by Rodolfo Rodríguez in 1983.

Saporiti played club football for Montevideo Wanderers, when they were one of the strongest teams in the amateur era of Uruguayan football and is remembered as one of the club's most important players.

Honours

Uruguay
Copa América: (2) 1916, 1917

Wanderers
Uruguayan league: (2) 1906, 1908
Copa de Honor: (2) 1908, 1910
Copa Competencia: (5) 1906, 1908, 1911, 1917, 1918
Copa de Honor Cousenier: (1) 1908
Cup Tie Competition: (3) 1911, 1917, 1918

References

1887 births
1954 deaths
Date of death unknown
Footballers from Montevideo
Uruguayan footballers
Uruguay international footballers
Association football goalkeepers
Montevideo Wanderers F.C. players
Copa América-winning players